USA-239, also known as GPS IIF-3, GPS SVN-65, and Navstar-67 is an American navigation satellite which forms part of the Global Positioning System. It was the third of twelve Block IIF satellites to be launched.

Built by Boeing and launched by United Launch Alliance, USA-239 was launched at 12:10 UTC on 4 October 2012, atop a Delta IV carrier rocket, flight number D361, flying in the Medium+(4,2) configuration. The launch took place from Space Launch Complex 37B at the Cape Canaveral Air Force Station, and placed USA-239 directly into medium Earth orbit. The rocket's second stage failed to provide the expected full thrust in all of its three burns due to a leak above the narrow throat portion of the thrust chamber, however the stage had enough propellant margins to put the satellite in the correct orbit.

It is used to broadcast the PRN 24 signal, and operates in slot 1 of plane A of the GPS constellation.
 As of 2019 it remains in service.

References

Spacecraft launched in 2012
GPS satellites
USA satellites
Spacecraft launched by Delta IV rockets